Nikita Olegovich Medvedev (born 17 December 1994) is a Russian football player who plays as a goalkeeper for FC Rostov.

Career

Club
He made his professional debut in the Russian Professional Football League for FC Zenit-Izhevsk Izhevsk on 29 September 2013 in a game against FC Oktan Perm.

He made his Russian Premier League debut for FC Rostov on 9 September 2016 against FC Krylia Sovetov Samara.

Following Soslan Dzhanayev's injury, he became the first-choice FC Rostov goalkeeper during the 2016–17 season, including the Champions League 3–2 victory over Bayern and Europa League matchup against Manchester United. He kept the clean sheet for Rostov for 952 minutes in the national league as of 25 April 2017 and has beaten the all-time Russian league record of 939 minutes set by Ruslan Nigmatullin. He left Rostov on 9 June 2017.

On 14 June 2017, he signed a 5-year contract with FC Lokomotiv Moscow. In the first half of the 2017–18 season he was at first the backup to Guilherme and played two games, one in the Russian Cup and one in the Europa League. When Guilherme was injured, Lokomotiv manager decided to start Anton Kochenkov instead for the next several games, moving Medvedev to third-choice goalkeeper on the squad. His contract was terminated on 14 August 2020 after 3 seasons with the club in which he made no league appearances.

On 17 August 2020, he signed a two-year contract with FC Rubin Kazan. On 1 June 2022, Medveded signed a new three-year contract with Rubin.

On 21 July 2022, Medvedev returned to FC Rostov on a contract for two seasons, with an option for a third.

Career statistics

Club

Honours

Club
Lokomotiv Moscow
Russian Premier League (1): 2017–18

References

External links

1994 births
Sportspeople from Izhevsk
Living people
Russian footballers
Association football goalkeepers
FC Rostov players
FC Lokomotiv Moscow players
FC Zenit-Izhevsk players
FC Rubin Kazan players
Russian Premier League players
Russian First League players
Russian Second League players